Charles Robin Allen (2 January 1940 – 16 August 2020) was a British freelance writer and popular historian from London. His British parents were both born in India and his numerous works focus on the British Raj.

Biography
Charles Allen was born in Kanpur, India, where six generations of his family served under the British Raj. His father was a political officer on the North East Frontier. When Allen was four years old his father, Geoffrey St G.T. Allen was appointed Assistant Political Officer on the Balipara Frontier Tract in Assam, India. For several years the family lived at Sadiay, on the banks of the Brahmaputra River. It was here that Allen met the various tribesmen, mostly Abor and Mishmi warriors, that came down from the hills. Later when Allen had returned to England he heard about the exploits of his great grandfather, Colonel St G. C. Gore, Surveyor-General of India from 1899 to 1904, who had spent a lot of time in the Himalayas. Allen also met Colonel Kenneth Mason, who had been one of the last players in The Great Game, (a term that referred to the geo-political manoeuvrings between Great Britain and Russia in the late 19th and early 20th-centuries) Allen also received inspiration for his writing from earlier authors such as Sven Hedin.

When India became independent, in August 1947, the Allen family returned to England. However, not long after this move, Allen's father was asked to return to India to continue his work for the government. Allen and his brother stayed on in England to complete their education. Allen left Canford school, Dorset, with no qualifications. His only formal education was 18 months at a college in Perugia, Italy. Between 1966 and 1967 Allen moved to Nepal to work with Voluntary Service Overseas. In Nepal Allen developed a fascination with Buddhism and as time passed he began to see himself as “Buddhist”. In Kathmandu he met his future wife, Liz Gould, whom he married in 1972. Allen supported the rights of low-caste Dalits, opposing the injustices that he had seen when growing up in India. It was at this time that he became convinced that he had a future as a travel writer. Following his work with Voluntary Service Overseas, Allen embarked on a Himalayan Trek which won him the Sunday Telegraph Traveler of the year trophy in 1967.

Success as a writer, came in 1974 via his involvement with the BBC Radio 4 oral history series and subsequent book Plain Tales from the Raj. As Allen stated in the preface to the book, "It was my good luck to attend Michael Mason, as chela to his guru, serving my apprenticeship as an oral historian by being sent out with a bulky tape-recorder to interview 'survivors' of the British Raj in their homes." In December 1975, Allen was travelling in India when he received news that the book had reached the best seller list in the UK, vying with Edward Heath's new book Sailing. Subsequently, Allen spent long periods of his adult life in India as a traveller and writer of history. Allen also trekked and climbed extensively in the Himalayas, arctic Norway, the jungles of Sarawak and in 1979 was among the first foreigners for many years to reach "Cow Mouth" which is the traditional source of the Ganges River which lies at 3,962m (13,000 feet) above sea level, in the Gangotri glacier. The river emanates from a cavern called Gaumukh, meaning 'Cow's Mouth', because of its shape. Allen's work focuses largely on India and the Indian Subcontinent in general. 
Allen was criticised for not acknowledging the subcontinent's natural and political history during the British rule by Edward Said in his book Orientalism. Allen countered in 2015 thst “We use that word history — we bandy it about too seriously. History is a minefield. It has always been used as propaganda. We have to look at it with an open mind.”

Allen died at his home in London, England on 16 August 2020 aged 80. He is survived by his children and his wife, Elizabeth. Allen was awarded the Sir Percy Sykes gold medal in 2004, by the Royal Society for Asian Affairs for his services to south Asian history. At the time of his death he had just completed Aryans a book, which tells the story of ancient Aryan migration to India. The book will be published in 2021. He was an active Fellow of the Royal Geographical Society and the Royal Asiatic Society, a Council Member of the Kipling Society and a Member of the Royal Society for Asian Affairs and the Frontline Club.

Among his works are Kipling Sahib: India and the making of Rudyard Kipling, a biography of Rudyard Kipling.

Works

Books
 1975. Plain Tales from the Raj: Images of British India in the Twentieth Century.
 1977. RAJ: A Scrapbook of British India 1877-1947. 
 1979. Tales from the Dark Continent: Images of British Colonial Africa in the Twentieth Century.
 1982. A Mountain in Tibet: The Search for Mount Kailas and the Sources of the Great Rivers of Asia. 
 1983. Tales from the South China Seas: Images of the British in South-East Asia in the Twentieth Century.
 1984. Lives of the Indian Princes, with co-author Sharada Dwivedi.
 1987. Kipling's Kingdom: His Best Indian Stories.
 1986. A Glimpse of the Burning Plain: Leaves from the Journals of Charlotte Canning.
 1988. A Soldier of the Company: Life of an Indian Ensign 1833-43. 
 1989. Architecture of the British Empire, Ed. R. Fermor-Hesketh.
 1990. The Savage Wars of Peace: Soldiers' Voices 1945-1989. 
 1991. Thunder and Lightning: the RAF in the Gulf War.
 1999. The Search for Shangri-La: a Journey into Tibetan History.
 2000. India Through the Lens: Photography 1840-1911, Ed. Vidya Dehejia.
 2000. Soldier Sahibs: the Men who Made the North-West Frontier. .
 2002. The Buddha and the Sahibs: the Men who Discovered India's Lost Religion. 
 2004. Duel in the Snows: the True Story of the Younghusband Mission to Lhasa.
 2005. Maharajas: Resonance from the Past.
 2006. God's Terrorists: the Wahhabi Cult and the Hidden Roots of Modern Jihad.
 2007. Kipling Sahib: India and the Making of Rudyard Kipling..
 2008. The Buddha and Dr Fuhrer: an Archaeological Scandal. .
 2011. The Taj at Apollo Bunder: the History of the Taj Mahal Palace, Mumbai, with co-author Sharada Dwivedi.
 2012. Ashoka: the Search for India's Lost Emperor. .
 2015. The Prisoner of Kathmandu: Brian Hodgson in Nepal 1820-43. . 
 2017. Coromandel: a personal history of South India. .
 2017. Introduction to Rudyard Kipling, The Eyes of Asia.

Film
 2013. Bones of the Buddha (host).

References

External links

1940 births
2020 deaths
People from Kanpur
British writers
British historians
Historians of India
British expatriates in Italy
British expatriates in Nepal